Güngörmez is a village in the Mecitözü District of Çorum Province in Turkey. Its population is 93 (2022). The village is populated by Kurds.

References

Villages in Mecitözü District
Kurdish settlements in Çorum Province